Neville Chamberlain  (24 October 1939 – 8 October 2018) was a British Anglican bishop. He served as Bishop of Brechin in the Scottish Episcopal Church from 1997 to 2005.

Biography 
He was born on 24 October 1939 and educated at Salford Grammar School and the University of Nottingham.

He was ordained in 1964. He was Assistant Curate at St Paul's, Balsall Heath and then Priest in charge at St Michael's Hall Green. He was a Probation Officer in Grimsby from 1972 to 1974 when he became the Executive Secretary of the Lincoln Diocesan Social Responsibility Committee. In 1982, he became Rector of St John the Evangelist, Edinburgh, a post he held for 15 years. He was Bishop of Brechin from 1997 to 2005.

He was the Master of Sexey's Hospital.

Chamberlain died on 8 October 2018.

References

1939 births
2018 deaths
People educated at Salford Grammar School
Alumni of the University of Nottingham
Bishops of Brechin (Episcopalian)
20th-century Scottish Episcopalian bishops